William J. Stuntz (July 3, 1958 – March 15, 2011) was a criminal justice scholar and a professor at Harvard Law School.

Stuntz was born in Washington, D.C. and grew up Annapolis, Maryland.  He received his Bachelor's at The College of William & Mary and his degree in law at University of Virginia School of Law. Subsequently, he clerked for Associate Supreme Court Justice Lewis F. Powell, Jr. Following this, Stuntz taught at the University of Virginia School of Law for over a decade, before moving to Harvard Law School in 1999.

Stuntz's last work, published posthumously, is The Collapse of American Criminal Justice. He succumbed to cancer in March 2011 at the age of 52. He was an outspoken evangelical Christian.

See also 
 List of law clerks of the Supreme Court of the United States (Seat 1)

References

1958 births
2011 deaths
American legal scholars
College of William & Mary alumni
Harvard Law School faculty
Law clerks of the Supreme Court of the United States
People from Annapolis, Maryland
People from Washington, D.C.
University of Virginia School of Law alumni